de Bourdeille is a surname. Notable people with the surname include:

 Claude de Bourdeille, comte de Montrésor ( 1606–1663), French aristocrat
 Pierre de Bourdeille, seigneur de Brantôme ( 1540–1614), French historian, soldier, and biographer